Brent is a housing estate in Cornwall, England, UK.

References

Hamlets in Cornwall
Polperro